Villa Somalia is a building in Mogadishu, the capital of Somalia. It serves as the palace and principal workplace of the President of Somalia.

History
The edifice was built in the Art Deco style by the colonial authorities in Italian Somaliland, serving as a residence for the Governors.

Villa Somalia (originally called Villa del Viceré when inaugurated in October 1936) was on high ground that overlooked Italian Mogadishu on the Indian Ocean, with access to both the harbour and Petrella airport. It was originally a large, squarish stucco building with a tiled roof.

The edifice was built in the new section of the city (developed by the Italians in the late 1930s) and it was a famous symbol of modernist (art deco) architecture.

Following independence in 1960, the building became the presidential palace of the President of the Somali Republic. After the start of the civil war and the overthrow of the Siad Barre administration in the early 1990s, various local faction leaders fought for control of and installed themselves in the residence.

On 8 January 2007, Transitional Federal Government President Abdullahi Yusuf Ahmed entered Mogadishu for the first time since being elected to office. The government subsequently relocated to Villa Somalia from its interim location at Baidoa.

Today, it is the office of the President of Somalia Hassan Sheikh Mohamud.

Chief of Staff 
Mohamed appointed Fahad Yasin to the position of Chief of Staff for Villa Somalia in April 2017.

On 8 September 2021 Mohamed appointed Abdisaid Muse Ali as Chief of Staff for Villa Somalia, previously he was National Security Advisor to the President.

See also
Governor's Palace of Mogadishu

References

External links
 Video of Villa Somalia in 1991
 Villa Somalia on Twitter

Presidential residences
Buildings and structures in Mogadishu
Art Deco architecture
Buildings and structures completed in 1932
Italian Somaliland